Alexander Michael Brightman (born February 5, 1987) is an American actor, singer, and writer. He is best known for his work in musical theatre, specifically as Dewey Finn in the musical adaptation of School of Rock and the title character in Beetlejuice the Musical. Both roles earned him nominations for the Tony Award for Best Actor in a Musical in 2016 and 2019 respectively.

Early life  
Brightman grew up in Saratoga, California. He is Jewish. His father founded Apple's Worldwide Disabilities Solutions Group, and his mother ran a kidney dialysis clinic. He attended Bellarmine College Preparatory, an all-male Jesuit high school in San Jose, California, and graduated in 2005.
In addition, he performed with Children’s Musical Theater San Jose during his youth.

Career

Broadway 
Brightman first worked on Broadway in 2008, as an ensemble member and understudy in Glory Days, which closed after only one performance. Brightman never performed in the show. Thereafter, Brightman was cast as the munchkin Boq and made his Broadway debut in Wicked. He stayed with the show for two years. His next Broadway role was in 2012 in Big Fish as an ensemble member and an understudy for a main role. Later in 2013, Brightman was cast as Michael Wormwood in Matilda the Musical.

In 2014, Brightman joined Andrew Lloyd Webber's musical, School of Rock, adapted from the 2003 film of the same name. Initially, Brightman played various roles that were meant to be played by child actors but were performed by adults for the workshops. Brightman was cast in the starring role of Dewey, first, in the show's concert performances, and then, in his first starring role, in the Broadway production. Brightman performed as Dewey Finn at the Winter Garden Theatre on Broadway.  For this performance, Brightman received a nomination for the 2016 Tony Award for Best Actor in a Musical. Brightman played his final performance as Dewey on November 5, 2016 and returned to reprise the role for a limited run in April 2017. He returned to Broadway in 2019 to play the title role in Beetlejuice (based on the film of the same name). He was again nominated for the Tony Award for Best Actor in a Musical at the 73rd Tony Awards ceremony.

Other work 
Brightman is a member of the comedy group, The (M)orons, along with fellow Broadway actors/writers, Andrew Kober, F. Michael Haynie, and Drew Gasparini. Brightman is currently developing two new musicals entitled The Whipping Boy and It's Kind of a Funny Story (based on the novel of the same name), with Gasparini, for which Brightman wrote the script. Brightman made an appearance on Impractical Jokers during Brian "Q" Quinn's musical punishment that's based on the latter's real-life experience as a firefighter and leaving that life behind for TV fame. In October 2019, it was announced that Brightman will be joining the cast of the Billy Crystal helmed comedy film Here Today. Brightman was revealed in 2020 to be voicing the character Fizzarolli, and his robotic doppelganger Robo Fizz, in web based cartoon series Helluva Boss. In addition, he voiced Pugsly and the demon possessing him, Temeluchus in the Netflix animated series Dead End: Paranormal Park.

Personal life 
Brightman married casting director, Jenny Ravitz on May 21, 2018 at a ceremony in Brooklyn.

Brightman has revealed that he utilizes ventricular fold phonation, allowing him to create the signature gruff voice of Beetlejuice and Fizzarolli without strain on his vocal cords.

Stage credits 

 Brightman also reprised the role of Dewey Finn for a limited run in April 2017.

Filmography

Film

Television

Awards and nominations

References

External links
 
 
 

1987 births
Living people
American male musical theatre actors
American male stage actors
Place of birth missing (living people)
People from Santa Clara, California
People from Saratoga, California
Jewish actors